KOGA may refer to:

 KOGA (AM), a radio station (930 AM) licensed to Ogallala, Nebraska, United States
 KOGA-FM, a radio station (99.7 FM) licensed to Ogallala, Nebraska, United States
 KOGA, a Dutch bicycle manufacturer